Shwebon Yadana Mingala Palace is a royal palace in Shwebo, Myanmar. The palace was originally built in 1753 AD by King Alaungphaya U Aung Zeya, who was the first founder of the Konbaung dynasty and was capital city until 1760 when the capital was moved to nearby Sagain. Different to other Royal Palaces in Myanmar it was centered on a large graduated pavilion.  Having two walls, the outer wall forms a 3.5 km square closure, surrounded by a moat. With the tomb of King Alaungpaya located to the southeast of the palace building. It was reconstructed in 1999 based on a mid 19th-century manuscript on a November 1853 expedition to collect the remaining timber posts of the palace, carve them out, and turn them into sacred images..  It has 200m long city walls.

References

Palaces in Myanmar
Buildings and structures in Sagaing Region